Angaaray is a 1998 Indian Hindi-language action thriller film produced by Madhu Ramesh Behl on Rose Movies Combines banner, directed by Mahesh Bhatt. It stars Akshay Kumar, Nagarjuna, Pooja Bhatt, Sonali Bendre and music is composed by Anu Malik and Aadesh Shrivastava.
It is inspired by the American film State of Grace. Mahesh Bhatt again used the same theme in his 2003 film Footpath starring Aftab Shivdasani and directed by Vikram Bhatt.

Plot
Bangalore-based police inspector Amar (Akshay Kumar) is approached by Mumbai's police commissioner, Vinod Talwar (Naresh Suri), and is assigned the task to go undercover and locate and kill the killer(s) of a businessman, Khanna. Amar soon finds out that the culprit is his childhood friend, Raja Lokhande (Nagarjuna) He is also called King Nag. Amar's other childhood friends, Jaggu Lokhande (Paresh Rawal) and Surya (Irfan Kamal), are also working for Lala Roshan Lal (Gulshan Grover), a major ganglord. He joins their gang as well using their friendship.

Meanwhile, Amar rekindles an old flame with his childhood sweetheart, Pooja (Pooja Bhatt), who is Surya's sister. Pooja has distanced herself from her brother and friends as she wants to lead an honest life. Amar tells her that they can be reformed. Meanwhile, Lala starts to suspect Amar to be a mole in the gang after an encounter goes wrong. Jaggu confronts Amar, who denies it, supported by Raja. Jaggu then tells him to kill a police inspector to prove himself. Amar agrees and Pooja, in anger, distances herself from him as well. Amar shoots the police inspector in front of the gang and has proved his worth.

However, it is later revealed that the shootout was a hoax. Vinod confronts Amar telling him that he is not killing Raja and others because they are his childhood friends. Amar still insists that he can reform them and that Lala is the only actual culprit. Meanwhile, Surya tries to make up with Pooja and asks for her to tie rakhi on his wrist. At the same time, Lala's brother enters lusting after her. This anger Surya who beats him very hard. Lala hides at home, but when Amar and Raja go out to look out for the police, Jaggu calls him outside. It turns out that Jaggu betrayed Surya and gets him killed.

Raja is now hungry for Lala's brother's blood and kills him. Amar reveals to Pooja that he is an undercover cop. Amar finds out that Raja has killed Lala and confronts him. However, the police force enters at the exact moment to shoot Raja while Roma, Raja's girlfriend, faints. Amar reveals that he is a cop and begs to take Roma to the hospital while Raja runs away. Very angry, Raja confronts Amar and is about to kill him. Amar manages to calm him down, and Raja agrees to surrender after Roma is found pregnant. Jaggu meanwhile receives news from Lala that he can hide Raja but should bring Amar to him. Jaggu goes to their place and gives Raja tickets to escape Mumbai, but he insists on surrendering. Jaggu angrily tells him that police can't be trusted, but Amar then reveals that he knew Jaggu was the one who got Surya killed. Jaggu realises what grave mistakes he has done and agrees to surrender as well. However, Lala's men start to attack their place with fire bombs, so Amar and Raja go out to finish them. Raja gets shot in the knee and tells Amar to catch Lala at any cost. Amar chases Lala and finally catches him. He then kills Lala at the spot, and Vinod and the police arrive.

In the end, it is revealed that Raja and Jaggu will face 10 and 7 years of jail, respectively, after they agreed to be police, informants. Meanwhile, Amar is taken to police custody for questioning.

Cast

 Akshay Kumar as Inspector Amar
 Nagarjuna as Raj Lokhande (Raja)
 Pooja Bhatt as Pooja
 Sonali Bendre as Roma
 Gulshan Grover as Lala Roshanlal
 Paresh Rawal as Jaggu Lokhande
 Kulbhushan Kharbanda as Khanna
 Irfan Kamal as Surya
 Mohan Kapoor as Lala Roshanlal's brother
 Naresh Suri as Police Commissioner Vinod Talwar
 Razak Khan as Jaggu's friend
 Anant Jog as Police Inspector
 Kunal Khemu as Young Amar
 Master Shaurya Mehta as Young Raja 
 Master Girish Prakash as Young Jaggu 
 Master Bunty as Young Surya
 Baby Gazala as Young Pooja

Soundtrack

The music was composed by Anu Malik and Aadesh Shrivastava. Lyrics were written by Javed Akhtar. The music was released by T-Series Audio Company.

References

External links
 

1998 films
1990s Hindi-language films
Indian action thriller films
1998 action thriller films
Films directed by Mahesh Bhatt
Films scored by Anu Malik
Films scored by Aadesh Shrivastava
Rose Audio Visuals
Indian remakes of American films
Hindi-language action films